The 2015–16 Botswana Premier League was the 51st season of the Botswana Premier League since its establishment in 1966. Township Rollers won their 13th league title after defeating Centre Chiefs, 5–1, in the championship playoff. The playoff was announced following controversy as to who the rightful champion was following a series of point deductions and appeals. Township Rollers were docked 10 points for using ineligible player Ofentse Nato, dropping from 70 points to 60 and into second place with the decision.  Following a series of appeals by both Township Rollers and Centre Chiefs, the Botswana Football Association decided to hold a championship game at the National Stadium on June 15, although the match was later postponed and played on August 11 at Molepolole Stadium in Molepolole.

Motlakase Power Dynamos, BR Highlanders and Satmos finished in the bottom three spots, respectively, and will be relegated to the Botswana First Division for the 2016–17 season.

Team summaries

Promotion and relegation
Teams promoted from Botswana First Division North and South
 Galaxy FC
 Green Lovers
 Miscellaneous SC

Teams relegated to Botswana First Division North and South
 ECCO City Greens
 Letlapeng FC
 Notwane F.C.

Stadiums and locations

League table

Championship

Township Rollers defeated Centre Chiefs 5–1 to win their 13th league title. With the win, Township Rollers gained entry into the 2017 CAF Champions League.

Results
All teams play in a double round robin system (home and away).

Results by round

Positions by round

References 

Botswana Premier League
Botswana